SIPCOT IT Park  Information Technology located in Siruseri in the city of Chennai, along the IT Corridor, Chengalpattu District, India. It is developed in 782.51 acres (4 km2) of land by SIPCOT, the State Industries Promotion Corporation of Tamil Nadu, a fully government-owned institution. Founded in June 1971, it is the largest IT park in Asia.

Places

Companies
 Tata Consultancy Services
 Hexaware Technologies
 Amtex System
 Signals and Systems India Pvt Ltd
 Sensiple Software Solutions Pvt Ltd
 Kumaran Systems Private Limited
 Newgen Software Technologies
 Yantro Softwares (P) Ltd
 Changepond Technologies
 Aspire Systems
 Data Pattern India Pvt Ltd
 Intellect design arena Pvt Ltd
 CareVoyant Technologies Private Ltd
 Cognizant Technology Solutions
 Capgemini
 Financial Software & Systems (P) Ltd
 Syntel
 Placka Information Technologies Pvt Ltd
 Apollo
 ONCOSPARK India Pvt Ltd
 Steria
 Interlace India PVT LTD
 Excelacom
 Cornet Technologies India
 CES
 Computech Corporation
 WhiteFont Technologies
 Jean Martin Inc
 Decatrend Technologies
 SolverMinds
 Reliance Jio Infocom Ltd
 Hi-Tech Company Software Solutions (Chennai) P Ltd
 Arvees Systems Private Limited
 MED technologies
 Bikashrout
 Agastha Software
 RemoteState

Educational institutions 
 Chennai Mathematical Institute
 Mohamed Sathak A.J College of Engineering

 Institute for Technology and Management (ITM)
 PSBB School, L&T Eden Park Township, Siruseri

Incidents

Murder of TCS employee 
A 24-year-old female employee of Tata Consultancy services was murdered on 13 February 2014, whose body was later discovered in a bush within the SIPCOT IT Park premises on 22 February 2014. Three construction workers were arrested in the case. Women's groups demanded a proactive approach by the government and the corporate sector in ensuring women's safety.

External links
 SIPCOT's official page on the IT Park
 SIPCOT IT Park map
 Pragnya Eden Park

References

Software technology parks in Chennai